Ninde-Mead-Farnsworth House, also known as Iriscrest and the Philo T. Farnsworth House, is a historic home located at Fort Wayne, Indiana.  It was built about 1910, and is a -story, side gabled, Colonial Revival style frame dwelling. It features a pedimented entrance portico.  It has American Craftsman style design elements including shed roofed dormers and overhanging eaves.  Television pioneer Philo Farnsworth (1906–1971) lived here from 1948 to 1967.

It was listed on the National Register of Historic Places in 2013.

References

Houses on the National Register of Historic Places in Indiana
Colonial Revival architecture in Indiana
Houses completed in 1910
National Register of Historic Places in Fort Wayne, Indiana
Houses in Fort Wayne, Indiana